Bohova may refer to: 

In Bulgaria:
Bohova, Bulgaria, a village in the Municipality of Tran

In Slovenia:
Bohova, Hoče–Slivnica, a settlement in the Municipality of Hoče–Slivnica, northeastern Slovenia